This is a list of supermarket chains in Sweden.

Defunct chains

References

Supermarket chains
Sweden